The following is a list of events affecting American television during 1996. Events listed include television show debuts, finales, cancellations, and channel initiations, closures and rebrandings, as well as information about controversies and disputes.

Notable events

January

February

March

April

May

June

July

August

September

October

November

December

Television programs

Debuts

Returning this year

Ending this year

Made for TV movies and miniseries

Entering syndication this year

Changes of network affiliation

Television stations

Station launches

Stations changing network affiliation

Station closures

Births

Deaths

See also
 1996 in the United States
 List of American films of 1996

References

External links
List of 1996 American television series at IMDb

 
1990s in American television